Ellen Van Loy (born 16 September 1980) is a Belgian road and cyclo-cross cyclist. She represented her nation in the women's elite event at the 2016 UCI Cyclo-cross World Championships in Heusden-Zolder.

References

External links
 

1980 births
Living people
Cyclo-cross cyclists
Belgian female cyclists
People from Herentals
Cyclists from Antwerp Province
21st-century Belgian women